Krnica is a small settlement next to Rižana in the City Municipality of Koper in the Littoral region of Slovenia.

References

External links
Krnica on Geopedia

Populated places in the City Municipality of Koper